Fred Engelhardt (April 15, 1885 - February 3, 1944) was an American college president. Engelhardt was the sixth President of the University of New Hampshire from 1937 to 1944. He graduated from Phillips Andover Academy. In 1908, Engelhardt went on to Yale and received a bachelor's degree in physics. Engelhardt then received an M.A. (1915) and a Ph.D. (1924) from Columbia University.

In 1942, he oversaw the establishment the Department of Arts at UNH.

Engelhardt died In Durham from cancer during his tenure.

The University of New Hampshire built a residence hall named Engelhardt Hall in his honor. It was dedicated on June 14, 1947.

References

External links 
"Fred Engelhardt Papers, 1937-1944", University of New Hampshire Library
University of New Hampshire: Office of the President
Full list of University Presidents (including interim Presidents), University of New Hampshire Library

1855 births
1944 deaths
Presidents of the University of New Hampshire
Yale College alumni
Columbia Graduate School of Arts and Sciences alumni